Guy Périllat Merceroz (born 24 February 1940) is a former World Cup alpine ski racer from the resort of La Clusaz, Haute-Savoie, one of the top ski racers of the 1960s.

Biography
On his twentieth birthday at the 1960 Winter Olympics, Périllat won the gold medal in the combined, a non-Olympic event at the time, but a World Championship title. Two days earlier, he won a bronze medal in the downhill. The following year, Périllat won both the classic downhills of Wengen and Kitzbühel, at the time only the third racer to have accomplished the feat in the same season.

The count now includes ten racers, with Austrians as the only multiple double-winners; Toni Sailer twice (1956–57), and Franz Klammer three consecutive (1975–77).  The others are Christian Pravda of Austria (1954), Jean-Claude Killy of France (1967), Karl Schranz of Austria (1969), Roland Collombin of Switzerland (1974), Ken Read of Canada (1980), Franz Heinzer of Switzerland (1992), and Stephan Eberharter of Austria (2002).

At the 1962 World Championships in Chamonix, France, Périllat took second in the slalom.  Four years later at Portillo, Chile in August 1966, he won the world championship in the giant slalom and again took the silver in the slalom.

While most of his success came before the World Cup era, Périllat won two slalom races in the first season of 1967.

Périllat took the silver medal in the downhill at the 1968 Winter Olympics, finishing behind countryman Jean-Claude Killy. Périllat retired from international competition following the 1969 season at age 29.

World Cup results

Season standings

Race victories

World Championship results 
From 1948 through 1980, the Winter Olympics were also the World Championships for alpine skiing.
At the World Championships from 1954 through 1980, the combined was a "paper race" using the results of the three events (DH, GS, SL).

Olympic results

References

External links

 
 Guy Perillat World Cup standings at the International Ski Federation
 
 

1940 births
Living people
French male alpine skiers
Olympic alpine skiers of France
Olympic silver medalists for France
Olympic bronze medalists for France
Olympic medalists in alpine skiing
Medalists at the 1960 Winter Olympics
Medalists at the 1964 Winter Olympics
Medalists at the 1968 Winter Olympics
Alpine skiers at the 1960 Winter Olympics
Alpine skiers at the 1964 Winter Olympics
Alpine skiers at the 1968 Winter Olympics
Sportspeople from Haute-Savoie
Officiers of the Légion d'honneur